John Love (17?? – August 17, 1822) was a nineteenth-century politician and lawyer from Virginia.

Biography
Growing up, Love pursued an academic course and studied law.  He was admitted to the bar in 1801 and commencing practice in Alexandria, Virginia. He was a member of the Virginia House of Delegates from 1805 to 1807 and from there was elected a Democratic-Republican to the United States House of Representatives in 1806, serving from 1807 to 1811. There, he served as chairman of the Committee on the District of Columbia from 1809 to 1811. Afterwards, he was a member of the Virginia State Senate from 1816 to 1820 and resumed practicing law. He died in Alexandria, Virginia on August 17, 1822.

External links

1822 deaths
Members of the Virginia House of Delegates
Virginia state senators
Virginia lawyers
Year of birth missing
Democratic-Republican Party members of the United States House of Representatives from Virginia
19th-century American lawyers
19th-century American politicians
Politicians from Alexandria, Virginia
Lawyers from Alexandria, Virginia